F. Scott Fitzgerald was an American writer known for his novels and short stories which often celebrated the decadence and excess of the Jazz Age. Many of his literary works were adapted into cinematic films, television episodes, and theatrical productions. Although a number of his works were adapted during his lifetime, the number of adaptations greatly increased following his death, and several cinematic adaptations gained considerable critical acclaim.

The earliest adaptations of Fitzgerald's work were flapper film comedies such as The Husband Hunter (1920) and The Off-Shore Pirate (1921). Notable film adaptations of his novel The Great Gatsby include a 1974 film—which featured a script by Francis Ford Coppola and starred Robert Redford and Mia Farrow—and a 2013 adaptation which featured Leonardo DiCaprio in the titular role. His later novel The Last Tycoon was adapted by Elia Kazan into a 1976 film, with an ensemble cast featuring Robert De Niro and Jack Nicholson among others.

Beyond adaptations of his novels and stories, Fitzgerald himself has been portrayed in a variety of media, including novels and theatrical productions. On film, he has been portrayed by actors such as Tom Hiddleston, Jeremy Irons, and Gregory Peck.

Adaptations

Short stories 

Fitzgerald's stories and novels have been adapted many times into a variety of media formats. His earliest short stories were cinematically adapted as flapper comedies such as The Husband Hunter (1920), The Chorus Girl's Romance (1920), and The Off-Shore Pirate (1921). The latter two both starred Viola Dana. His short story "Bernice Bobs Her Hair" was adapted in 1951 as a CBS Starlight Theatre episode starring Julie Harris and in 1976 as a PBS American Short Story episode starring Shelley Duvall. Additionally, his short story "The Curious Case of Benjamin Button" was the basis for a 2008 film.

Novels 
Nearly every novel by Fitzgerald has been adapted for the screen. His second novel The Beautiful and Damned was filmed in 1922 and 2010. His third novel The Great Gatsby has been adapted numerous times for both film and television over the past century, most notably in the 1926, 1949, 1958, 1974, 2000, and 2013 incarnations. His fourth novel Tender Is the Night was made into a 1955 CBS television episode, an eponymous 1962 film, and a BBC television miniseries in 1985. In 1976, his unfinished fifth novel The Last Tycoon was adapted into a film starring Robert de Niro, and in 2016 it was adapted as an Amazon Prime TV miniseries.

Portrayals 

Beyond adaptations of his novels and stories, Fitzgerald himself has been portrayed in dozens of books, plays, and films. He inspired Budd Schulberg's novel The Disenchanted (1950), which follows an apprentice screenwriter in Hollywood collaborating with a drunk and flawed novelist. It was later adapted into a Broadway play starring Jason Robards. A musical about the lives of Fitzgerald and his wife Zelda Sayre was composed by Frank Wildhorn in 2005 and entitled Waiting for the Moon. Due to his continuing appeal and international reputation as an author, the Japanese Takarazuka Revue created a musical adaptation of Fitzgerald's life.

The last years of Fitzgerald's life and his relationship with Sheilah Graham served as the basis for Beloved Infidel (1959) based on Graham's 1958 memoir of the same name. The film depicts an alcoholic Fitzgerald (played by Gregory Peck) and his struggle with sobriety while romancing Graham (played by Deborah Kerr). Another film, Last Call (2002) chronicles the relations between Fitzgerald (Jeremy Irons) and his private secretary Frances Kroll Ring (Neve Campbell). 

Other depictions include the TV movies Zelda (1993, with Timothy Hutton), F. Scott Fitzgerald in Hollywood (1976, with Jason Miller), and The Last of the Belles (1974, with Richard Chamberlain). Tom Hiddleston and Alison Pill appear briefly as Fitzgerald and Zelda in Woody Allen's 2011 feature film Midnight in Paris. David Hoflin and Christina Ricci portray the Fitzgeralds in the 2015 television series Z: The Beginning of Everything. Guy Pearce and Vanessa Kirby portray the couple in Genius (2016).

List of adaptations

Films

Short films

Television

List of portrayals

References

Citations

Works cited

 
 
 
 
 
 
 
 
 
 
 
 
 
 
 
 
 
 
 
 

Adaptations
Lists of works based on short fiction
Lists of television series based on works
Lists of films based on works